The Olympus μ("mju") 700 — also known as the Olympus Stylus 710 in North America — is a 7.1 megapixel ultra-compact digital camera introduced by Olympus Corporation in 2006.

It features a 1/2.3″ CCD, a 3x zoom lens, and a weatherproof body like some of the other Olympus Stylus cameras and has a maximum resolution of 3072 × 2304 pixels. It is also the most lightweight camera of the Stylus line, weighing only 103 g without the battery and xD-Picture Card.

The µ700 was available in several different colors: black, silver, orange, and blue.

Sample photos

External links

Olympus USA: Stylus 710
Steve's Digicams: Olympus Stylus 710 review
ThinkCamera: Olympus Mju 700 review
Olympus Stylus 710 specs

µ700
Cameras introduced in 2006